This is a list of villages in Stara Zagora Province, Bulgaria.

 Benkovski
 Bratya Daskalovi
 Bratya Kunchevi
 Byal Izvor
 Darzhava
 Daskal-Atanasovo
 Dimitrievo
 Dolno Selo
 Dolno Novo Selo
 Edrevo
 Elhovo
 Gita
 Gledachevo
 Golyam Dol
 Gorno Botevo
 Granit
 Iskritsa
 Kanchevo
 Kazanka
 Khan Asparuhovo
 Kolyu Marinovo
 Konare
 Kovachevo
 Kozarevets
 Madrets
 Malak Dol
 Malka Vereya
 Malko Dryanovo
 Markovo
 Matsa
 Mirovo
 Musachevo
 Naidenovo
 Nova Mahala
 Novo Selo
 Opalchenets
 Opan
 Orizovo
 Oslarka
 Ostra Mogila
 Panicherevo
 Pastrovo
 Plodovitovo
 Ploska Mogila
 Podslon
 Pomoshtnik
 Pravoslav
 Pryaporets
 Pshenichevo
 Razhevo
 Rumanya
 Saedinenie
 Samuilovo
 Sarnevets
 Sladak Kladenets
 Slavyanin
 Srednogorovo
 Starozagorski bani
 Sulitsa
 Tselina
 Vasil Levski
 Veren
 Zlatna Livada

See also
 List of villages in Bulgaria

 
Stara Zagora